Busão do Brasil was a Brazilian reality television show, which premiered July 30, 2010 with the season finale airing October 19, 2010 on the Band television network.

The show was presented by former MTV Brasil VJ Edgard Piccoli, with the direction of Michael Ukstin. There were twelve contestants competing for the grand prize, which was R$1,000,000 without tax allowances.

Twenty-nine-year-old police officer Mario Remo won the competition over student Thalita Wagner and fashion designer Camilla Fit at the live finale.

Production

Cast
Casting and production started in March 2010. Applications were due by May 3, 2010 until June 3, 2010. Ultimately, twelve contestants were chosen by the producers to participate the show between July to October 2010.

The bus
During three months, the bus traveled for 11 different Brazilian states, covering about 4,000 miles and stopping in 14 cities.

Format
Busão do Brasil is a reality television show created by Endemol, in which a group of people live together in a large and luxury bus, isolated from the outside world but continuously watched by television cameras.

The series lasted for around three months, where the contestants tried to win a cash prize by avoiding periodic evictions from the bus.

Voting format
Each week the public makes the nominations. On Friday night, the lines are temporarily frozen and the three highest rated contestants are revealed to the public, while only clues to the nominated candidates are given to contestants. Then, the lines are re-opened until Tuesday night, where the three contestants who received the most votes throughout the week face the elimination.

Contestants

On Day 1, twenty-four hopefuls arrived at the entrance of the bus. Only eleven contestants were selected to enter out of all candidates. The twelfth contestant was selected by a special vote, in which the eleven contestants vote for one of the thirteen that were not originally chosen. A new contestant, Teca, entered the bus on Day 47.

(ages stated at time of contest)

Summaries

The Bus tour

Voting history

Notes

References

External links
 Official site 

Rede Bandeirantes original programming
Brazilian reality television series
2010 Brazilian television series debuts
2010 Brazilian television series endings
2010s Brazilian television series
Portuguese-language television shows